This is list of members of the Argentine Chamber of Deputies from 10 December 2013 to 9 December 2015.

Composition

By province

By political groups
as of 9 December 2015

Election cycles

List of Deputies
The table is sorted by provinces in alphabetical order, and then with their deputies in alphabetical order by their surnames. All deputies start their term on December 10, and end it on December 9 of the corresponding years, except when noted.

Notes

References

External links
List of deputies in the official website (archived)

2013
2013 in Argentina
2014 in Argentina
2015 in Argentina